Heads or Tails (Spanish:Águila o sol) is a 1937 film of the cinema of Mexico.

This was Mario Moreno’s a.k.a. Cantinflas's third film and the second in a row with co-star Manuel Medel. After the completion of the film and with the help of Mendel, an already accomplished actor, Cantinflas decided to pursue a career of his own.  The film was written, adapted and directed by Russian-born Arcady Boytler.  The movie was placed on the 84th spot among the 100 best movies of the cinema of Mexico, a list created by Mexican film experts.

Cast
 Mario Moreno "Cantinflas" as Polito Sol
 Manuel Medel as Carmelo Águila
 Margarita Mora as Teresa
 Marina Tamayo as Adriana Águila
 Luis G. Barreiro as Castro
 Manuel Arvide as Hipólito Sol
 Margarita Sodi as young Adriana
 Jesús de la Mora as young Polito
 José Girón Torres as young Carmelo
 Dora Ceprano as Dora
 Ramón Rey as "El Gallego"
 Teresa Rojas
 Emma Vogel
 Blanca Rosa Otero
 José Elías Moreno
 Rafael Baledón
 Virginia Serret
 Julio Ahuet
 Toña la Negra
 Rafael Hernández
 Rafael Díaz
 Antonio Escobar

Plot

At birth, three children are abandoned in a convent. They are Polito Sol and his siblings, Adriana and Carmelo Águila and they grow up to become the "Águila o Sol" trio. Many years later, Don Hipólito, Polito's father becomes rich and decides to search for his son.  In the end he finds Polito and the Aguila siblings.

External links
  Águila o sol at the cinema of Mexico site of the ITESM
  Biography of Manuel Medel
 

1937 films
1937 musical comedy films
1930s Spanish-language films
Mexican black-and-white films
Films directed by Arcady Boytler
Mexican musical comedy films
1930s Mexican films